English medium school is one of the education systems in Bangladesh that follows mostly the curriculum of Edexcel and Cambridge of UK and other curriculums of other countries also, such as IB curriculum. All the textbooks of every subject are taught in English except for Music, Bangla and religious subjects which is taught in Arabic in some schools. English-medium schools are growing in popularity among the middle class, upper-middle-class and rich families. The English-medium schools not only teach the students about their own countries but also about the European History and Literature.

The exams of the O-level and A-level students of Edexcel and Cambridge are conducted through British Council Bangladesh. The Daily Star Award is the most prestigious award provided to O-Level and A-Level examinees of Bangladesh, for their extraordinary academic performance. The criteria for an award are: 6 'A's in O-Levels, 3 'A's in A-Levels, and highest marks in O-Levels and A-Levels.

Language
The English-medium schools teach most of the subjects in English. Bengali is also taught. French and Spanish is taught in International School Dhaka. The St Francis Xavier's Green Herald International School also teaches French to its students from grade 6 onwards. These language skills help the students later in life when they go abroad for higher studies.

Criticisms
Critics of English medium curriculum point out that the students of English-medium are weak in their mother-tongue (Bengali). They say that in English-medium schools, English is the first priority. They also argue that English-medium students are less patriotic. These criticisms are similar to those that can be found in English-medium education. This is not always true, however. These days, schools try their best to educate their students about their own culture. Also, the students are not taught the social studies courses which sometimes discusses about the social problems the government is dealing with.

History
St Francis Xavier's Green Herald International School is the first English medium school in Bangladesh which was established in 1912.

References

 Education in Bangladesh